Kizil may refer to:

People
 Bahar Kizil (born 1988), German singer-songwriter

Places
 Kizil Caves, Buddhist rock-cut caves located near Kizil Township
 Kızıl Kule, main tourist attraction in the Turkish city of Alanya
 Kızılırmak River, longest river  in Turkey
 Kyzyl, capital of the Tuva Republic in Russia
 Kizil, a former name for Ștefan Vodă city, Moldova

See also
 Battle of Kızıl Tepe
 Kizil massacre
 Kyzyl (disambiguation)

Turkish-language surnames